A stirrup is a metal loop supporting the foot, fastened to a saddle on a riding animal.
Stirrup may also refer to:

 Baseball stirrups, a type of socks worn by baseball players
 the braces supporting the lithotomy position utilised in medical examinations such as a pelvic exam
 A clamp (tool) or support in the shape of a stirrup
 Rebar bent in a loop and used to reinforce concrete 
 The stapes, a bone of the ear resembling a stirrup
 Stirrup pants, a form of leggings with a strap beneath the arch of the foot

See also

 
 
 Jock Stirrup, nickname of Britain's Air Chief Marshal Sir Graham Eric Stirrup
 Frank Stirrup, English rugby league footballer of the 1950s and 1960s
 Stirrup cup
 Stirrup jar, a two-handled amphora whose opposing handles connect the aperture to the sides of the vessel
 Stirrup shell, a species of bivalve
 Stirrup spout vessel, a type of ceramic vessel used by indigenous cultures of South America
 Stir-up Sunday, in religion
 Stir (disambiguation)